Rock On is the debut album of singer/songwriter David Essex. Its lead single and title track, "Rock On", is still Essex's best known song in the United States.  "Lamplight" was also a hit, and the album contains three covers.

Track listing

Personnel
Musicians
David Essex – vocals
Julie Covington, Doreen Chanter, Irene Chanter, Jimmy Helms, Gary Osborne, Jimmy Thomas, Paul Vigrass, Billy Laurie, Tom Saffrey  – backing vocals
Jeff Wayne, Alan Hawkshaw – Moog synthesizer
Mark Griffiths, Jo Partridge, Kirby Gregory – guitar
Herbie Flowers – bass
Ray Cooper – percussion
Barry de Souza – drums
John Morton – Ondes Martinot

Technical
 Gary Martin – engineer
 Jeff Wayne – producer, arranger, conductor
 London Weekend Television – photography

Charts

References

David Essex albums
1973 debut albums
CBS Records albums
Columbia Records albums